The Morgenthau Plan was a proposal to weaken Germany following World War II by eliminating its arms industry and removing or destroying other key industries basic to military strength. This included the removal or destruction of all industrial plants and equipment in the Ruhr. It was first proposed by United States Secretary of the Treasury Henry Morgenthau Jr. in a 1944 memorandum entitled Suggested Post-Surrender Program for Germany.

While the Morgenthau Plan had some influence until July 10, 1947 (adoption of JCS 1779) on Allied planning for the occupation of Germany, it was not adopted. US occupation policies aimed at "industrial disarmament", but contained a number of deliberate loopholes, limiting any action to short-term military measures and preventing large-scale destruction of mines and industrial plants, giving wide-ranging discretion to the military governor and Morgenthau's opponents at the War Department. An investigation by Herbert Hoover concluded the plan was unworkable, and would result in up to 25 million Germans dying from starvation. From 1947, US policies aimed at restoring a "stable and productive Germany" and were soon followed by the Marshall Plan.

When the Morgenthau Plan was published by the US press in September 1944, it was immediately seized upon by the German government and used as part of propaganda efforts in the final seven months of the war in Europe that aimed to convince Germans to fight on.

Morgenthau's memorandum

The original memorandum, written some time between January and early September 1944, signed by Morgenthau, and headed "Suggested Post-Surrender Program for Germany" is preserved at the Franklin D. Roosevelt Presidential Library and Museum. According to Morgenthau's son, senior U.S. Treasury department official and alleged Soviet spy Harry Dexter White was influential in drafting the memorandum.

The main provisions can be summarized as follows:

The Second Quebec Conference (September 1944)
At the Second Quebec Conference, a high-level military conference held in Quebec City, September 12–16, 1944, the British and United States governments, represented by Winston Churchill and Franklin D. Roosevelt respectively, reached agreement on a number of matters, including a plan for Germany, based on Morgenthau's original proposal. The memorandum drafted by Churchill provided for "eliminating the warmaking industries in the Ruhr and the Saar... looking forward to converting Germany into a country primarily agricultural and pastoral in its character." However, it no longer included a plan to partition the country into several independent states.

This memorandum is also referred to as the Morgenthau Plan.

Roosevelt's support for the plan

As Secretary of the Treasury, Morgenthau was initially not involved in the drafting of the plans for Germany. On a trip to Europe at the beginning of August, Harry Dexter White, his most trusted collaborator in the Treasury Department, presented him the memorandum from the State Department. This plans left Morgenthau with the fact that the main aim was to rebuild Germany economically to such an extent that after a few years they would be able to pay reparations. For him, it came down to the fact that after 10 years they would be ready to start World War III.

After his return from Europe, Morgenthau informed the Secretary of State Cordell Hull that he would immediately take care of Germany's affairs with the following words: "I appreciate the fact that this isn't my responsibility, but I'm doing this as an American citizen, and I'm going to continue to do so, and I’m going to stick my nose into it until I know it is all right." He right away informed the President of his observations and the dangers he saw in the existing memorandum drawn up by Hull. The President showed increased interest in what had been accomplished, but despite all of Morgenthau's hopes, Roosevelt initially did not officially invite him to take part in the drafting of the plans.

Morgenthau now tried to achieve his objective in another way. In a meeting with the Secretary of War Henry L. Stimson shortly thereafter, he suggested that a committee consisting of Stimson, Hull, and himself should meet to work out a memorandum for the upcoming conference in Quebec. In his next attempt at the President, he once again made clear what irrevocable consequences it would have if the plan were implemented as it is. He also exclusively showed excerpts that he knew would displease the President. The lecture did not miss its aim. Morgenthau's explanations  persuaded Roosevelt to write to Secretary of State Cordell Hull and Secretary of War Henry L. Stimson that US occupation policy, which anticipated that "Germany is to be restored just as much as the Netherlands or Belgium", was excessively lenient. A better policy would have the Germans "fed three times a day with soup from Army soup kitchens", so "they will remember that experience the rest of their lives."

In addition, Roosevelt officially set up a committee consisting of Morgenthau, Stimson, and Hull that should deal with the future of Germany together. However, due to serious disagreement, the committee was unable to draw up a collaborative memorandum. Morgenthau on one side was drafting plans for how Germany could be ruined industrially, while other parts of the US government were already forging plans for how the country could be rebuilt after Nazi rule. Above all, the American business elite, which was still closely intertwined with German companies during the war, was interested in getting back to business as soon as possible. Secretary of State Hull on the other hand was outraged by Morgenthau's "inconceivable intrusion" into foreign policy. Hull told Roosevelt that the plan would inspire last-ditch resistance and cost thousands of American lives. Hull was so upset over the plan that he suffered from insomnia and eating problems and was hospitalized. He later resigned for health reasons, though there were anecdotal reports that his resignation was brought about by "the Morgenthau business". So it came about, the Cabinet Committee on Germany met with Roosevelt on September 6, 1944, discussed three different memoranda prepared by the State, War, and Treasury Departments.

The fact that Morgenthau was able to present his plans in Quebec despite the great resistance within the US government is precisely due to this state of health in Hull. Because, actually, Roosevelt asked Cordell Hull to accompany him to Quebec. But he was unable to do so for health reasons. It was only at the last minute, when the conference was on, that Roosevelt asked Morgenthau to follow him to Quebec. Ultimately, Roosevelt's motivations for agreeing to Morgenthau's proposal may be attributed to his desire to be on good terms with Joseph Stalin and to a personal conviction that Germany must be treated harshly. In an August 26, 1944, letter to Queen Wilhelmina of the Netherlands, Roosevelt wrote that "There are two schools of thought, those who would be altruistic in regard to the Germans, hoping by loving kindness to make them Christians againand those who would adopt a much 'tougher' attitude. Most decidedly I belong to the latter school, for though I am not bloodthirsty, I want the Germans to know that this time at least they have definitely lost the war."

Churchill's initial opposition to the plan
Churchill was not initially inclined to support the proposal, saying "England would be chained to a dead body."  Roosevelt reminded Churchill of Stalin's comments at the Tehran Conference, and asked "Are you going to let Germany produce modern metal furniture?  The manufacture of metal furniture can be quickly turned into the manufacture of armament." The meeting broke up on Churchill's disagreement but Roosevelt suggested that Morgenthau and White continue to discuss with Lord Cherwell, Churchill's personal assistant.

Lord Cherwell has been described as having "an almost pathological hatred for Nazi Germany, and an almost medieval desire for revenge was a part of his character". Morgenthau is quoted as saying to his staff that "I can't overemphasize how helpful Lord Cherwell was because he could advise how to handle Churchill". In any case, Cherwell was able to persuade Churchill to change his mind. Churchill later said that "At first I was violently opposed to the idea. But the President and Mr. Morgenthau from whom we had much to askwere so insistent that in the end we agreed to consider it".

Some have read into the clause "from whom we had much to ask" that Churchill was bought off, and note a September 15 memo from Roosevelt to Hull stating that "Morgenthau has presented at Quebec, in conjunction with his plan for Germany, a proposal of credits to Britain totalling six and half billion dollars."  Hull's comment on this was that "this might suggest to some the quid pro quo with which the Secretary of the Treasury was able to get Mr. Churchill's adherence to his cataclysmic plan for Germany".

At Quebec, White made sure that Lord Cherwell understood that economic aid to Britain was dependent on British approval of the plan. During the signing of the plan, which coincided with the signing of a loan agreement, President Roosevelt proposed that they sign the plan first. This prompted Churchill to exclaim: "What do you want me to do? Get on my hind legs and beg like Fala?"

Rejection of the plan
Anthony Eden expressed his strong opposition to the plan and, with the support of some others, was able to get the Morgenthau Plan set aside in Britain. In the United States, Hull argued that nothing would be left to Germany but land, and only 60% of the Germans could live off the land, meaning 40% of the population would die.  Stimson expressed his opposition even more forcefully to Roosevelt. According to Stimson, the President said that he just wanted to help Britain get a share of the Ruhr and denied that he intended to fully deindustrialize Germany. Stimson replied, "Mr. President, I don't like you to dissemble to me" and read back to Roosevelt what he had signed. Struck by this, Roosevelt said he had "no idea how he could have initialed this". The theory that Roosevelt was not truly rejecting the plan is supported by later remarks by Eleanor Roosevelt, who stated that she never heard him disagree with the basics of the plan, and who believed that "the repercussions brought about by the press stories made him feel that it was wise to abandon any final solution at that time", but other sources suggest that Roosevelt "had not realized the devastating nature of the program he had initialed".

On May 10, 1945, President Truman approved JCS (Joint Chiefs of Staff policy) 1067 which directed the US forces of occupation in Germany to "take no steps looking toward the economic rehabilitation of Germany [nor steps] designed to maintain or strengthen the German economy".

Wartime consequences
Journalist Drew Pearson publicized the plan on 21 September 1944. Although Pearson himself was sympathetic to it, more critical stories in The New York Times and The Wall Street Journal quickly followed. Joseph Goebbels used the Morgenthau Plan in his propaganda. Goebbels said that "The Jew Morgenthau" wanted to make Germany into a giant potato patch. The headline of the Völkischer Beobachter stated, "Roosevelt and Churchill Agree to Jewish Murder Plan!"

The Washington Post urged a stop to helping Dr. Goebbels: if the Germans suspect that nothing but complete destruction lies ahead, then they will fight on. The Republican presidential candidate Thomas Dewey complained in his campaign that the Germans had been terrified by the plan into fanatical resistance, "Now they are fighting with the frenzy of despair".

General George Marshall complained to Morgenthau that German resistance had strengthened. Hoping to get Morgenthau to relent on his plan for Germany, President Roosevelt's son-in-law Lt. Colonel John Boettiger who worked in the War Department explained to Morgenthau how the American troops who had to fight for five weeks against fierce German resistance to capture the city of Aachen had complained to him that the Morgenthau Plan was "worth thirty divisions to the Germans". Morgenthau refused to relent.

On December 11, 1944, OSS operative William Donovan sent Roosevelt a telegraph message from Bern, warning him of the consequences that the knowledge of the Morgenthau plan had had on German resistance.  The message was a translation of a recent article in the Neue Zürcher Zeitung.

Influence on policy
Following the negative public reaction to the publishing of the Morgenthau plan, President Roosevelt disowned it, saying "About this pastoral, agricultural Germany, that is just nonsense. I have not approved anything like that. I am sure I have not. ... I have no recollection of this at all." The president died before the end of the war, and the plan never took effect.

In January 1946 the Allied Control Council set the foundation of the future German economy by putting a cap on German steel production; the maximum allowed was set at about 25% of the prewar production level. Steel plants thus made redundant were dismantled.

Also as a consequence of the Potsdam Conference, the occupation forces of all nations were obliged to ensure that German standards of living could not exceed the average level of European neighbors with which it had been at war, France in particular. Germany was to be reduced to the standard of life it had known in 1932. The first "level of industry" plan, signed in 1946, stated that German heavy industry was to be lowered to 50% of its 1938 levels by the closing of 1,500 manufacturing plants.

The problems brought on by the execution of these types of policies were eventually apparent to most US officials in Germany. Germany had long been the industrial giant of Europe, and its poverty held back the general European recovery. The continued scarcity in Germany also led to considerable expenses for the occupying powers, which were obligated to try to make up the most important shortfalls through the GARIOA program (Government and Relief in Occupied Areas). In view of the continued poverty and famine in Europe, and with the onset of the Cold War which made it important not to lose all of Germany to the communists, it was apparent by 1947 that a change of policy was required.

The change was heralded by Restatement of Policy on Germany, a famous speech by James F. Byrnes, then United States Secretary of State, held in Stuttgart on September 6, 1946. Also known as the "Speech of hope" it set the tone of future US policy as it repudiated the Morgenthau Plan economic policies and with its message of change to a policy of economic reconstruction gave the Germans hope for the future. Herbert Hoover's situation reports from 1947, and "A Report on Germany" also served to help change occupation policy. The Western powers' worst fear by now was that the poverty and hunger would drive the Germans to Communism. General Lucius Clay stated "There is no choice between being a communist on 1,500 calories a day and a believer in democracy on a thousand."

After lobbying by the Joint Chiefs of Staff, and Generals Clay and Marshall, the Truman administration realized that economic recovery in Europe could not go forward without the reconstruction of the German industrial base on which it had previously been dependent. In July 1947, President Truman rescinded on "national security grounds" the punitive JCS 1067, which had directed the US forces of occupation in Germany to "take no steps looking toward the economic rehabilitation of Germany". It was replaced by JCS 1779, which instead stressed that "[a]n orderly, prosperous Europe requires the economic contributions of a stable and productive Germany".

The most notable example of this change of policy was a plan established by US Secretary of State George Marshall, the "European Recovery Program", better known as the Marshall Plan, which in the form of loans instead of the free aid received by other recipients was extended to also include West Germany.

JCS 1067

A Handbook for Military Government in Germany was ready in August 1944: it advocated a quick restoration of normal life for the German people and reconstruction of Germany. Henry Morgenthau, Jr. brought it to the attention of President Franklin D. Roosevelt who, after reading it, rejected it with the words:

A new document was drafted, the Joint Chiefs of Staff directive 1067 (JCS 1067). Here the US military government of occupation in Germany was ordered to "take no steps looking toward the economic rehabilitation of Germany [or] designed to maintain or strengthen the German economy" and it was also ordered that starvation, disease and civil unrest were to be kept below such levels where they would pose a danger to the troops of occupation.

The directive was formally issued to Eisenhower in the spring of 1945, and it applied only to the US zone (although attempts had been made to get the other Allies to accept it). The occupation directive remained secret until October 17, 1945. It was made known to the public two months after the US had succeeded in incorporating much of it into the Potsdam Agreement.

On May 10, 1945, Truman signed JCS 1067. Ignoring the amendments to JCS 1067 that had been inserted by McCloy of the War Department, Morgenthau told his staff that it was a big day for the Treasury, and that he hoped that "someone doesn't recognize it as the Morgenthau Plan".

In occupied Germany Morgenthau left a direct legacy through what in OMGUS commonly were called  "Morgenthau boys". These were US Treasury officials whom Dwight D. Eisenhower had "loaned" to the Army of occupation. These people ensured that the JCS 1067 was interpreted as strictly as possible. They were most active in the first crucial months of the occupation, but continued their activities for almost two years following the resignation of Morgenthau in mid-1945 and some time later also of their leader Colonel Bernard Bernstein, who was "the repository of the Morgenthau spirit in the army of occupation".

Morgenthau had been able to wield considerable influence over Joint Chiefs of Staff Directive 1067. JCS 1067 was a basis for US occupation policy until July 1947, and like the Morgenthau Plan, was intended to reduce German living standards. The production of oil, rubber, merchant ships, and aircraft were prohibited. Occupation forces were not to assist with economic development apart from the agricultural sector.

In his 1950 book Decision in Germany, Clay wrote, "It seemed obvious to us even then that Germany would starve unless it could produce for export and that immediate steps would have to be taken to revive industrial production."  Lewis Douglas, chief adviser to General Lucius Clay, US High Commissioner, denounced JCS Directive 1067 saying, "This thing was assembled by economic idiots. It makes no sense to forbid the most skilled workers in Europe from producing as much as they can in a continent that is desperately short of everything." Douglas went to Washington in the hopes of having the directive revised but was unable to do so.

In 1947, JCS 1067 was replaced by JCS 1779, which instead stated that "An orderly, prosperous Europe requires the economic contributions of a stable and productive Germany."   It had taken over two months for General Clay to overcome continued resistance to the new directive JCS 1779, but on July 10, 1947, it was approved at a meeting of the SWNCC (State-War-Navy Coordinating Committee). The final version of the document "was purged of the most important elements of the Morgenthau plan".

In view of increased concerns by General Lucius D. Clay and the Joint Chiefs of Staff over communist influence in Germany, as well as of the failure of the rest of the European economy to recover without the German industrial base on which it was dependent, in the summer of 1947, Secretary of State George Marshall, citing "national security grounds", convinced President Harry S. Truman to revoke JCS 1067, and replace it with JCS 1779. JCS 1067 had then been in effect for over two years.

The "Morgenthau boys" resigned en masse when JCS 1779 was approved, but before they went, the Morgenthau followers in the decartelization division of OMGUS accomplished one last task in the spring of 1947: the destruction of the old German banking system.  By breaking the relationships between German banks, they cut off the flow of credit between them, limiting them to short-term financing only, thus preventing the rehabilitation of German industry and with immediate adverse effects on the economy in the US occupation zone.

With the change of occupation policy, most significantly thanks to the currency reform of 1948, Germany eventually made an impressive recovery, later known as the Wirtschaftswunder ("economic miracle").

Morgenthau's book Germany is Our Problem

In October 1945, Harper and Brother published Morgenthau's book Germany is Our Problem, where Morgenthau described his plan and the rationale for it in greater detail. President Franklin D. Roosevelt had granted permission for the publication of the book the evening before his death, when dining with Morgenthau at Warm Springs.

In November 1945, General Dwight D. Eisenhower, the military governor of the US Occupation Zone, approved the distribution of 1,000 free copies of the book to American military officials in occupied Germany. Historian Stephen Ambrose draws the conclusion that, despite Eisenhower's later claims that the act was not an endorsement of the Morgenthau plan, Eisenhower both approved of the plan and had previously given Morgenthau at least some of his ideas on how Germany should be treated.

A review in The New York Times on October 7, 1945, felt that the book was important to the survival of the American people and would help prevent World War III. A review by Orville Prescott on October 5, 1945, in the same newspaper concluded that the whole world would benefit if copies of the book reached the key US decisionmakers responsible for policy about Germany.

Implementation
The Morgenthau Plan, in the sense of the plan drafted by Morgenthau or the plan initialed by Roosevelt, was never implemented. Germany was not made "primarily agricultural and pastoral in its character". However, some commentators, such as Gareau, extend the term to mean "any postwar program designed to effect and preserve German disarmament by significantly reducing German industrial might". JCS-1067, the April 1945 "Directive to Commander-in-Chief of United States Forces of Occupation Regarding the Military Government of Germany" specified the Allied objective as being "to prevent Germany from ever again becoming a threat to the peace of the world", including, as an essential step, "the industrial disarmament and demilitarization of Germany".

Plans for German industry 

On February 2, 1946, a dispatch from Berlin reported:

By February 28, 1947, it was estimated that 4,160,000 German former prisoners of war, by General Dwight D. Eisenhower relabeled as Disarmed Enemy Forces in order to negate the Geneva Convention, were used as forced labor by the various Allied countries to work in camps outside Germany: 3,000,000 in Russia, 750,000 in France, 400,000 in Britain, and 10,000 in Belgium.
Meanwhile, in Germany large parts of the population were starving at a time when, according to a study done by former US President Herbert Hoover, the nutritional condition in countries in Western Europe was nearly pre-war normal. German prisoners engaged in dangerous tasks, such as clearing mine fields.

In Germany, shortage of food was an acute problem. According to Alan S. Milward, in 1946–1947 the average kilocalorie intake per day was only 1,080, an amount insufficient for long-term health. Other sources state that the kilocalorie intake in those years varied between as low as 1,000 and 1,500. William Clayton reported to Dean Acheson in Washington on May 27, 1947: “Millions of people in the cities are slowly starving.”

All armaments plants, including some that could have been converted to civilian operation, were dismantled or destroyed. A large proportion of operational civilian plants were dismantled and transported to the victorious nations, mainly France and Russia.

Early US plans for "industrial disarmament" included detaching the Saarland and the Ruhr from Germany in order to remove much of the remaining industrial potential.

As late as March 1947 there were still active plans to let France annex the Ruhr.

The Saar Protectorate, another important source of coal and industry for Germany, was likewise to be lost by the Germans. It was cut out from Germany and its resources put under French control. In 1955, the French, under pressure from West Germany and her newfound allies, held a plebiscite in the Saar Protectorate on the question of reunification or independence. Reunification won overwhelmingly, and on January 1, 1957, it rejoined West Germany as the state of Saarland.

As Germany was allowed neither airplane production nor any shipbuilding capacity to supply a merchant navy, all facilities of this type were destroyed over a period of several years. A typical example of this activity by the allies was the Blohm & Voss shipyard in Hamburg, where explosive demolition was still taking place as late as 1949. Everything that could not be dismantled was blown up or otherwise destroyed. A small-scale attempt to revive the company in 1948 ended with the owners and a number of employees being thrown in jail by the British. It was not until 1953 that the situation gradually started to improve for the Blohm & Voss, thanks in part to repeated pleas by German Chancellor Konrad Adenauer to the Allied High Commissioners.

Timber exports from the US occupation zone were particularly heavy. Sources in the US government stated that the purpose of this was the "ultimate destruction of the war potential of German forests". As a consequence of the practiced clear-felling, extensive deforestation resulted which could "be replaced only by long forestry development over perhaps a century".

Over a period of years, American policy slowly changed away from this policy of "industrial disarmament". The first and main turning point was the speech "Restatement of Policy on Germany" held in Stuttgart by the United States Secretary of State James F. Byrnes on September 6, 1946.

Reports such as this by former US President Herbert Hoover, dated March 1947, also argued for a change of policy, among other things through speaking frankly of the expected consequences.

In July 1947, President Harry S. Truman rescinded on "national security grounds" JCS 1067, which had directed the US forces of occupation in Germany to "take no steps looking toward the economic rehabilitation of Germany".

In addition to the physical barriers that had to be overcome, for the German economic recovery there were also intellectual challenges. The Allies confiscated intellectual property of great value, all German patents both in Germany and abroad, and used them to strengthen their own industrial competitiveness by licensing them to Allied companies. Beginning immediately after the German surrender and continuing for the next two years, the US pursued a vigorous program to harvest all technological and scientific know-how as well as all patents in Germany. John Gimbel comes to the conclusion, in his book Science Technology and Reparations: Exploitation and Plunder in Postwar Germany, that the "intellectual reparations" taken by the US and the UK amounted to close to $10 billion. During the more than two years that this policy was in place, no industrial research in Germany could take place without any results being automatically available to overseas competitors who were encouraged by the occupation authorities to access all records and facilities. Meanwhile, thousands of the best German researchers were being put to work in the Soviet Union (Operation Osoaviakhim) and in the UK and US (see also Operation Paperclip).

The Marshall Plan was extended to also include Western Germany after it was realized that the suppression of the Western German economy was holding back the recovery of the rest of Europe.

In 1949, West German Chancellor Konrad Adenauer wrote to the Allies requesting that the policy of industrial dismantling end, citing the inherent contradiction between encouraging industrial growth and removing factories and also the unpopularity of the policy.

In 1953, it was decided that Germany was to repay $1.1 billion of the aid it had received. The last repayment was made in June 1971. In a largely symbolic 2004 resolution by the lower house of the Polish Parliament, reparations of $640 billion were demanded from Germany, mainly as a weapon in an ongoing argument regarding German property claims on formerly German territory. However, at the Potsdam Conference the Soviet Union undertook to settle the reparation claims of Poland from its own share of reparations from Germany. In 1953 Poland agreed to forego further reparations claims against Germany. Meanwhile, Poland was now in possession of almost a quarter of pre-war German territory, including the important industrial centers in Silesia and the richest coal fields in Europe. In addition, many ethnic Germans living within the Polish pre-war borders were prior to their expulsion for years used as forced labor in camps such as the camp run by Salomon Morel, for example, Central Labour Camp Jaworzno, Central Labour Camp Potulice, Łambinowice, Zgoda labor camp and others.

Assessment and contemporary relevance 
Historical assessments differ with regard to the nature, duration and effects of Morgenthau's plan and JCS 1067 on American and Allied policies.

The US diplomat James Dobbins writes that an early draft of JCS 1067 had been written while the plan was still understood to be US policy, and "[b]ecause nothing replaced the Morgenthau plan once it had been disavowed, the final version of JCS 1067 contained many of the harsh measures and all the intent of a hard peace toward Germany". However, according to Dobbins, in May 1945 – shortly after its approval in April 1945 – the newly appointed deputy military governor, General Clay, implied that the directive was unworkable and initially wanted it to be revised; after the deliberate loopholes were pointed out to him, General Clay did not press further for a revision but "took great liberties in interpreting and implementing JCS 1067". Clay's good-willed effort did meet obstacles, like General Marshall forbidding him from relaxing the strict non-fraternization to a more reasonable level. Dobbins remarks that the harsh punitive measures shifted toward reform over time as the US faced with the problem of feeding millions of Germans and the Soviet expansion. 
 mentions that the American military government was, until 1947, operating under JCS 1067, which he describes as "a framework  that had its origin in the Morgenthau Plan".

 also mentions that "As far as I know the results [of the revisionist debate], it seems to me that, although plans for a policy concerning post-war Germany had been developed as early as 1941, no plan had been adopted by the president that could have served as a basis for a purposeful policy. This resulted in the German question being postponed to after the final victory over the Axis Powers and Japan. At most, the short-lived approval of the Morgenthau Plan by Roosevelt might possibly be seen as a guiding principle of his policy toward Germany, especially since important elements of this plan found their way into [JCS 1067]."  talks of the policy of "Never again a strong Germany!" that found its expression in the famous JCS 1067 (which was influenced by the Morgenthau Plan), but this principle was abandoned by the USA soon after the Potsdam Conference, though it was not until 1947 that JSC 1067 was replaced by JSC 1779 and its related "European Recovery Program".

Kindleberger states that "With the termination of hostilities, the mood of suppression gave way to ambivalence – in the West. Germany needed to be punished for wrongdoing, but it was also essential to revive the German economy for its necessary contribution to European recovery. The stern pronouncement of the Joint Chiefs of Staff Directive (JCS 1067) that the United States commander should do nothing to restore the German economy above the minimum level necessary to prevent such disease and unrest as might endanger the occupation forces gave way in July 1945 to an order to stimulate coal production for export delivery to Belgium, the Netherlands, and France" (which did not materialize). In May 1946, General Clay's stop-order on the dismantling of plants (for reparations) marked the first open recognition of the failure of Potsdam. After 1947, when conflicting policies began to be reconciled, economic and social conditions began to be improved.

Henry Burke Wend refers to JCS 1067, as approved on 14 May 1945, as a compromise document which, "together with Truman's ascension to the presidency [on 12 April 1945], spelled the demise of the Morgenthau Plan". Despite this, "denazification, deconcentration and dismantling had a profound, if varied, impact on German industrial recovery." Even with the introduction of the Marshall Plan, self-defeating policies that simultaneously industrialized Germany (by investing billions of dollars) and deindustrialized it (through heavy dismantling of its industry) continued until 1948–1949. Walter M. Hudson describes JSC 1067 as less harsh than Morgenthau's plan: while core elements of the Morgenthau Plan were incorporated in JCS 1067, it was deliberately diluted, and permitted the military government to be more flexible than envisaged by the Morgenthau Plan.

The German Federal Agency for Civic Education (BPD) asserts that the Morgenthau Plan was never implemented and was only briefly supported by Roosevelt, and that JSC 1067, while treating Germany as a defeated enemy state instead of a liberated nation and aiming at the dismantling of German industries, also left loopholes that allowed a military governor to later implement more lenient policies. The agency states that the purpose of JCS 1779, which replaced JCS 1067, was to increase German self-government at the regional level, limit dismantling of war industries, raise living standards, and remove dependence on subsidies.

German historian  talks of the failure of Morgenthau and the backward-looking political minority that supported him, stating that by the end of 1945 Morgenthau's staff had returned to the USA despondent, and those then in charge were not interested in "industrial disarmament". However, according to Greiner, the "Morgenthau myth" was perpetuated in West Germany by right-wing extremist historians echoing Nazi propaganda and railing against an "extermination plan" for Germany by Jews and the left-wing intelligentsia in America, while in Communist East Germany the Morgenthau Plan was presented as a western imperialist plot to destroy Germany.

Wolfgang Benz, director of the Center for Research on Antisemitism at the Technical University of Berlin, states that the plan had no significance for the later occupation and Germany policy, though Nazi propaganda on the subject had a lasting effect and is still used for propaganda purposes by extreme right-wing organizations. Benz also states that Morgenthau had romantic agrarianist ideals which might mean that the intentions of his plan could have been beyond preventing conflicts. German historian Rainer Gömmel criticizes the common claim by historians, including Benz, that the Morgenthau Plan was never implemented, arguing that core elements of the plan, namely the proposals for deindustrialization, were adopted in August 1945 and became part of Allied policy.

A number of historians considered that Morgenthau may have been influenced by Harry Dexter White, an alleged Soviet agent based on Venona evidence, to develop the Morgenthau Plan – as the weakening of industry in Western Allied occupied territory would be beneficial to the Soviet Union's campaign for influence in postwar Germany. The hypothesis is based on White's previous pro-Soviet actions such as advocating virtually unlimited Soviet printing of AM-Marks which transferred wealth to East Germany. Critics of the hypothesis, such as historian James C. Van Hook, state that the Morgenthau Plan rejected reparations that were part of official Soviet demands, and Harry Dexter White's other economic initiatives at Bretton Woods were so in favor of postwar capitalism that it is difficult to see him as entirely a Soviet agent.

The relevant volume of the British official history of the Second World War states that the Morgenthau Plan "exercised little influence upon Allied policy after the Potsdam Conference ... where more realistic views were adopted". The history argues though that prior to the conference the plan "disastrously bedevilled much military government planning" and led to an ill-judged hardening of Allied plans for occupied Germany as well as disagreements between the US and British governments.

See also
Dutch annexation of German territory after World War II
German reparations for World War II
Industrial plans for Germany
History of Germany since 1945
Marshall Plan
Monnet Plan, a post-war economic reconstruction plan for France
Nero Decree
Wirtschaftswunder ("Economic miracle," the seemingly 'miraculous' economic recovery of post-World War II West Germany)

Notes and references

Bibliography
 
 
 
 
 
 
  Basingstoke and New York, Palgrave Macmillan, 2010.  
  Milan, IPOC, 2008.]

Further reading
 .

External links

Documents

 
 Preparatory memorandum for the Quebec conference
 Joint Chiefs of Staff Directive 1067 JCS 1067/6 of 28 April 1945 (The final version, JCS 1067/8 of 10 May 1945, contained an amendment allowing the production of synthetic rubber and oil, aluminum, and magnesium to meet the needs of the occupying forces, where the previous version had ordered the complete destruction of such industries.)

Interviews

 General William H. Draper Jr. Chief, Economics Division, Control Council for Germany, 1945–46; Military Government Adviser to the Secretary of State, Moscow Conference of Foreign Ministers, 1947; Under Secretary of War, 1947; Under Secretary of the Army, 1947–49;
 E. Allan Lightner, Jr. Assistant Chief, 1945–47, and Associate Chief, 1947–48, of the Central European Affairs Division, Department of State
 Gunther Harkort Representative of the Federal Republic of Germany to the Economic Cooperation Administration (ECA), 1949–52.

Radio

 BBC Radio 4, History: Things We Forgot to Remember; The Morgenthau plan

1944 in international relations
1944 in Germany
Aftermath of World War II in Germany
Aftermath of World War II in the United States
Anti-German sentiment
Cold War
Dwight D. Eisenhower
Economic history of Germany
Germany–United States relations
Henry Morgenthau Jr.
Politics of World War II
Anthony Eden